Pierre Briant (born 30 September 1940 in Angers) is a French Iranologist, Professor of History and Civilisation of the Achaemenid World and the Empire of Alexander the Great at the Collège de France (1999 onwards), Doctor Honoris Causa at the University of Chicago, and founder of the website achemenet.com.

He studied History at the University of Poitiers (1960–1965), and reached his doctorat d'État in 1972.

His works deal mainly with the Achaemenid Empire, and related matters as Alexander the Great or the Hellenistic Era.

In the words of Matthew Stolper, Briant "has shown a generation of scholars once isolated from each other that they are members of a common intellectual project of great consequence."

Works
Antigone le Borgne (Les Débuts de sa Carrière et les Problèmes de l'Assemblée Macédonienne) (1973) - doctoral thesis.
Alexandre le Grand (1974, 2005)
Rois, Tributs et Paysans, Études sur les Formations Tributaires du Moyen-Orient Ancien (1982)
Etat et Pasteurs au Moyen-Orient Ancien' in Production Pastorale et Société (1982)
L'Asie Centrale et les Royaumes Proche-orientaux du Premier Millénaire (c. VIIIe-IVe s. av. n. è.) (1984)
"Pouvoir central et polycentrisme culturel dans l'Empire achéménide (Quelques réflexions et suggestions)", in Achaemenid History I: Sources,structures and synthesis (ed. Heleen Sancisi-Weerdenburg), (1987)
"Institutions perses et histoire comparatiste dans l'historiographie grecque", in Achaemenid History II: The Greek sources (eds. H. Sancisi-Weerdenbur & Amélie Kuhrt) (1987)
De la Grèce à l'Orient : Alexandre le Grand, collection « Découvertes Gallimard » (nº 27), série Histoire. Paris: Gallimard (1987; new edition in 2005, under the title )
Alexander the Great: The Heroic Ideal, 'New Horizons' series, London: Thames & Hudson (1996)
Alexander the Great: Man of Action, Man of Spirit, "Abrams Discoveries" series, New York: Harry N. Abrams (1996)
"Ethno-classe dominante et populations soumises dans l'Empire achéménide: le cas de l'Égypte", in Achaemenid History III: Method and Theory (eds. A. Kuhrt & H. Sancisi-Weerdenburg) (1988)
Darius : Les Perses et l'Empire, collection « Découvertes Gallimard » (nº 159), série Histoire. Paris: Gallimard (1992)
Dans les Pas des Dix-Mille (ed) (1995)
Histoire de l'Empire Perse. De Cyrus à Alexandre (1996) - in English, From Cyrus to Alexander: A History of the Persian Empire (2002).
Darius dans l'Ombre d'Alexandre (2003)
Lettre ouverte à Alexandre le Grand (2008)
Alexandre des Lumières. Fragments d'histoire européenne (2012)
Alexandre. Exégèse des lieux communs, Paris, Gallimard (2016)

See also
 Cyrus the Great

References

Briant's page at the Collège de France
Iranheritage.org
Honorary Degree ar  the Chicago University

External links
Achemenet
Achaemenid museum
P. Briant: Class system in Median and Achaemenid periods, in Encyclopaedia Iranica.

People from Angers
1940 births
Academic staff of the Collège de France
Living people
20th-century French historians
21st-century French historians
Corresponding members of the Académie des Inscriptions et Belles-Lettres
French Iranologists
Chevaliers of the Légion d'honneur
French male non-fiction writers
Corresponding Fellows of the British Academy